Emanuele Pessagno was one of a dozen s built for the  (Royal Italian Navy) in the late 1920s. Completed in 1930, she served in World War II.

Design and description
Their complement during wartime was 222–225 officers and enlisted men.

The Navigatoris were powered by two Tosi geared steam turbines, each driving one propeller shaft using steam supplied by four Odero-Terni-Orlando water-tube boilers.

Their main battery consisted of six  guns in three twin-gun turrets, one each fore and aft of the superstructure and the third amidships. Anti-aircraft (AA) defense for the Navigatori-class ships was provided by a pair of  AA guns in single mounts abreast the forward funnel and a pair of twin-gun mounts for  machine guns. They were equipped with six  torpedo tubes in two triple mounts amidships. The Navigatoris could carry 86–104 mines.

Construction and career
Emanuele Pessagno was laid down by Cantieri Navali Riuniti at their Ancona shipyard on 9 October 1927, launched on 12 August 1929 and commissioned on 10 March 1930.

Citations

Bibliography

External links
 Emanuele Passegno Marina Militare website

Navigatori-class destroyers
1929 ships
World War II destroyers of Italy
Maritime incidents in May 1942
Ships built in Ancona
Ships built by Cantieri Navali del Tirreno e Riuniti